The grey skate (Dipturus canutus) is a species of fish in the family Rajidae. It was described in 2008 by Australian ichthyologist Peter R. Last.

Taxonomy
Australian ichthyologist Peter Last described the grey skate from a specimen collected off Maria Island in Tasmania. The species name is the Latin adjective canutus "grey", referring to its colour.

Description
The grey skate is a medium-sized member of the genus, reaching  TL. It has grey upperparts, with the snout lateral to the rostral cartilage slightly paler, and paler grey to whitish underparts, with well-demarkated dark markings around the cloaca, internasal flap and chin.

Distribution and habitat
It is found in temperate waters off southern Australia, from Eucla in Western Australia around to Crowdy Head on the New South Wales north coast. In Tasmanian waters, it has been found from Strahan around to Maria Island, but is not in Bass Strait.

The grey skate is one of four species identified as threatened with extinction by trawling in a 2021 report.

Grey skates get caught up in demersal trawling and automatic longline fishing on the upper parts of the continental slope by the Southern and Eastern Scalefish and Shark fishery and the Great Australian Bight Trawl Fishery. Most die as a result. Little is known about the total population.

References

grey skate
Fish described in 2008
Marine fish of Southern Australia